The Bangladesh Women's Football League simply known as WFL and officially as Bashundhara Group Women's Football League for sponsorship reasons, is the highest level of women's club football competition of Bangladesh established in 2011.The league hosted and run by Bangladesh Football Federation.

History
Bangladesh Women's Football League is the country's top flight domestic women's football league which is founded in 2011 by Bangladesh Football Federation. After two consecutive season, the league was postponed for indefinite time because of unknown reason. After a long gap of 7 years, Bangladesh Football Federation organised the third edition in 2020. Currently Cholo Kheli Trust is the Strategic partner for Bangladesh Women's Football and for next three years. Cholo Kheli Trust, a charitable foundation formed to work in the fields of Sports, Education, Health combined with Information, create strategies and execute them in association with respective Ministries. Inspire next generation youth of Bangladesh to love, appreciate and pick sports and Play. The Trust also want them to be well Educated, Healthy and be informed by the Best standards in the World.

Seasons

References
 

Bangladesh Women's Football League seasons